Law of the Tropics is a 1941 American drama film directed by Ray Enright and starring Constance Bennett, Jeffrey Lynn and Regis Toomey. By the time Bennett made the film, her career was in steep decline.

The film is loosely based on the 1935 movie Oil for the Lamps of China, but the setting is changed from China to the Amazon jungle, and the tone is somewhat lighter. The conflict between a man's conscience and his corporate loyalty, which is a principal theme of the original, is less important in this film.

Plot summary

Cast

 Constance Bennett as Joan Madison  
 Jeffrey Lynn as Jim Conwoy  
 Regis Toomey as Tom Marshall  
 Mona Maris as Rita Marshall  
 Hobart Bosworth as Boss Frank Davis  
 Frank Puglia as Tito  
 Thomas E. Jackson as Det. Maguire  
 Paul Harvey as Alfred King, Sr.  
 Craig Stevens as Alfred King, Jr. 
 Charles Judels as Cap 
 Roland Drew as Hotel Clerk  
 Cliff Clark as Bartender  
 Rolfe Sedan as  Julio André
 Emory Parnell as Bartender

References

External links
 
 
 
 

1941 films
American drama films
1941 drama films
1940s English-language films
Films directed by Ray Enright
Warner Bros. films
Films based on American novels
American black-and-white films
1940s American films
English-language drama films